Super Highways is the second album by New Order members Gillian Gilbert and Stephen Morris under the name The Other Two. It was released in 1999 six years after their début, and a year after New Order reformed. Four tracks were co-written by Melanie Williams, who also sang lead on two of them ("You Can Fly" and "One Last Kiss") and backing vocals on the title track. The album was re-released in January 2010 by LTM Recordings, and in 2020 by Factory Benelux.

Track listing
 All songs written and composed by The Other Two, except where noted.

1 "Tasty Fish" (K-Klass Mix) was not featured on the Japanese edition of the album.

Personnel
 The Other Two (Gillian Gilbert, Stephen Morris) – production
 Tim Oliver – production (all tracks), bass, additional keyboards, additional programming (tracks 3, 12)
 Paddy Steer – bass (tracks 2, 5, 6, 10, 12)
 Mike Mooney – guitar (tracks 2, 3, 4, 8, 10)
 Melanie Williams – vocals (tracks 1, 2, 4)
 Lynton Naiff – strings (tracks 3, 12)
 Ash Howes – mixing (all tracks except 2)
 Hugo Nicolson – mixing (track 2)
 Peter Saville – art direction
 Howard Wakefield and Paul Hetherington – design

Release history

References

1999 albums
The Other Two albums
London Records albums